Flavor Aid is a non-carbonated soft drink beverage made by The Jel Sert Company in West Chicago, Illinois.  It was introduced in 1929.  It is sold throughout the United States as an unsweetened, powdered concentrate drink mix, similar to Kool-Aid brand drink mix.

Flavors
Flavor Aid currently comes in cherry, raspberry, grape, berry punch, tropical punch, orange, pineapple-orange, lemonade, pink lemonade, lemon-lime, strawberry, mango, and kiwi-watermelon flavors.

The manufacturer has also introduced several flavors of Flavor Aid designed to appeal to the Latino population with bilingual packaging and various exotic flavors. The Latino versions do not include cherry or berry punch, and instead include root beer, mango, apple, Jamaica (hibiscus), tamarindo, tangerine and pineapple-orange.

Jonestown massacre
The drink became linked to the Jonestown mass murder-and-suicide when it was learned that the cyanide poison taken by or forcibly administered to the commune's members was placed in Flavor Aid. Large barrels filled with the grape variety, laced with the cyanide and a variety of tranquillizer drugs, were found half-consumed amidst the hundreds of bodies. Kool-Aid, rather than Flavor Aid, is usually erroneously referred to as the drink used in the massacre, most likely due to it having become a generic trademark. The association with Kool-Aid has spawned the figure of speech "drink the Kool-Aid" but is regarded by some sources as a factual error.  Criminal investigators testifying at the Jonestown inquest spoke of finding packets of  "Kool aid" (sic), and eyewitnesses to the incident are also recorded as speaking of "kool aid" or "Cool Aid."

References

External links 
 Flavor Aid brand page, Jel Sert website

Powdered drink mixes
American soft drinks
Jel Sert brands
Products introduced in 1929
Peoples Temple